Quimbaya Museum is a museum located in Armenia, Colombia designed by Colombian architect Rogelio Salmona. It displays a large collection of precolumbian artcrafts, about 390 gold objects, 104 pottery, 22 stone sculptures, carved woods, and other issues, mainly from the precolumbian Quimbaya civilization, Embera and some other amerindian tribes. Some of the most important pieces are the gold Poporos (traditional gadgets for the chewing of the coca leaves) and the zoomorphic vases.  

Most of the pieces have been preserved for experts from Gold Museum of Bogotá. In its exhibition rooms together with other pottery, stone, shell, wood and textile archaeological objects, these items, made of what to indigenous cultures was a sacred metal, testify to the life and thought of different societies which inhabited what is now known as Colombia before contact was made with Europe.

The Bank of the Republic began in 1939 helping to protect the archaeological patrimony of Colombia. The Gold Museum and the Quimbaya Museum are some of its main achievements.

References

External links 
Quimbaya Museum

Archaeological museums in Colombia
Buildings and structures in Quindío Department
Armenia, Colombia
Tourist attractions in Quindío Department